Westcott is a neighborhood in Syracuse, New York, United States. Its proximity to Syracuse University makes for a diverse community, home to Syracuse University students, professors and other faculty and staff, as well as residents at all income levels. Westcott Street is the main retail street of the neighborhood, featuring numerous restaurants, coffee shops, stores and The Westcott Theater performing arts venue. It is the site of the annual Westcott Street Cultural Fair, a one-day celebration of the diversity and uniqueness of the neighborhood with food, art, live performances and cultural activities. Westcott is also home to Thornden Park, one of the largest parks in Syracuse. The Westcott neighborhood is the boyhood home of renowned banjoist Tony Trischka.

History

Westcott was founded in the late nineteenth century as a result of the growth of Syracuse University. In 1893, the neighborhood began being served by electric streetcars, which ran along Westcott Street and Euclid Avenue towards downtown Syracuse.  The current Westcott business district formed at the end of the streetcar line.

The Blanchard House, Thornden Park, and Babcock-Shattuck House are listed on the National Register of Historic Places.

Popular establishments 
Westcott Street is home to numerous restaurants, coffee shops, and stores that reflect the neighborhood's diversity and bohemian culture.

Alto Cinco 
Opened in 1995 as a takeout only restaurant, this Tex-Mex eatery is located in the heart of Westcott street, right next to The Westcott Theater. They are well known for their vegan-vegetarian options, and their use of natural, healthy and handmade ingredients. From their website, "Alto Cinco's longstanding mission has been to produce healthy handmade food with all fresh ingredients."

Recess Coffee 
This coffee house, opened in 2007, is located adjacent to Westcott Street. The brand has expanded to other regions of Syracuse, and they currently partner with over 60 different local cafes, restaurants and grocery stores to sell their self-titled brand of coffee.

Rise N Shine 
The newest location on Westcott Street, Rise N Shine's second location was opened in late summer of 2019.  The first location was located in East Syracuse, and features a retro hamburger place Called “LODED”, while this new location also features most of the same breakfast menu items as they did at the original location but also provides a unique breakfast, brunch and their words “Brinner” options. The restaurant uses fresh ingredients and locally sourced produce from the CNY area.

References

External links
Westcott Street Cultural Fair
Extensive history of Westcott
Westcott Neighborhood Association

Neighborhoods in Syracuse, New York
Populated places established in the 1890s